The 2016–17 Egypt Cup was the 85th edition of the oldest recognised football tournament in Africa. It was sponsored by Obour Land, and known as the Obour Land Cup for sponsorship purposes. 294 clubs were accepted into the tournament, and it began with the First Qualifying Round on 14 October 2016, and concluded with the final on 15 August 2017. The winner earns automatic qualification for the 2018 CAF Confederation Cup.

Egyptian Premier League side Zamalek were the defending champions, but were eliminated in the semi-finals by Al Masry.

Al Ahly won their 36th title after defeating Al Masry 2–1 in the final after the match went to extra time, winning their 1st Cup title since 10 years.

Teams

Round and draw dates
The schedule is as follows.

Qualifying rounds
The qualifying competition began with the First Qualifying Round on 14 October 2016. All of the competing teams that are not members of the Premier League will have to compete in the qualifying rounds to secure a place in the Round of 32. The final (fifth) qualifying round was played on 9 and 10 December 2016.

Bracket
The following is the bracket which the Egypt Cup resembled. Numbers in parentheses next to the match score represent the results of a penalty shoot-out.

Round of 32
A total of 32 clubs played in this round; 14 winners of the fifth qualifying round, and 18 teams from the Premier League entering in this round. The draw was held on 15 December 2016 at the EFA headquarters in Gezira, Cairo. The matches were played from 21 December 2016 to 17 February 2017. The round included one team from Level 3 still in the competition, Arab El Raml, who were the lowest-ranked team in this round.

All times are CAT (UTC+2).

Round of 16
A total of 16 clubs played in this round; all winners of the previous round. The draw was held on 15 December 2016 at the EFA headquarters in Gezira, Cairo. The matches were played from 5 February to 1 March 2017. The round included one team from Level 2 still in the competition, Haras El Hodoud, who were the lowest-ranked team in this round.

All times are CAT (UTC+2).

Quarter-finals
A total of 8 clubs played in this round; all winners of the previous round. The draw was held on 15 December 2016 at the EFA headquarters in Gezira, Cairo. The matches were played from 13 May to 18 July 2017.

All times are CAT (UTC+2).

Semi-finals
A total of 4 clubs played in this round; all winners of the previous round. The draw was held on 15 December 2016 at the EFA headquarters in Gezira, Cairo. The matches were played on 8 and 9 August 2017.

All times are CAT (UTC+2).

Final

The final was played on 15 August 2017 at Borg El Arab Stadium.

References

Notes

 
Egypt Cup
2016–17 in Egyptian football